Kfarjoz Municipal Stadium is a football field located in the  district of Nabatieh, Lebanon. The stadium can accommodate 2,000 spectators.

References

Football venues in Lebanon
Athletics (track and field) venues in Lebanon
Lebanon
Multi-purpose stadiums in Lebanon